Madina Central Mosque or simply Madina Mosque is one of the largest mosques in Ghana located in the La-Nkwantanang-Madina Municipal Assembly. It is the main mosque in the district that congregates worshipers for the Friday Jumu'ah prayers.
Established after 1959, Madina mosque houses two schools; a basic secondary school offering secular education and a college that specializes in Qur'anic studies. Alms-giving is a common scene in the vicinity of the Mosque and researchers have often used the location in their case studies to try to understand the phenomenon of beggary in Ghana.

See also
  Lists of mosques 
  List of mosques in Africa
  List of mosques in Egypt

References

1959 establishments in Ghana
Mosques completed in 1959
Mosques in Ghana